RTK 3 (English: Radio Television of Kosovo 3, Albanian: Radio Televizioni i Kosovës 3) is the third public television channel of Kosovo. As part of the Radio Television of Kosovo (RTK), a public service broadcaster, RTK 3 produces and airs newscasts and talk shows.

History 
After the launch of the second public channel (RTK 2), in March 2014, RTK 3 was launched, which is a 24-hour news channel for the Kosovar viewers. It also broadcasts political talk shows. RTK 3 was launched along with the fourth channel, RTK 4, on behalf of the EBU officials. The European Broadcasting Union also helped and funded the launch of the 2 new channels.

References

External links 
 

2014 establishments in Kosovo
Albanian-language television stations
Television channels and stations established in 2014
Television stations in Kosovo